Mookgophong, also known as Naboomspruit, is a town in the Limpopo province of South Africa. The town is located approximately 42 km north-east of Modimolle and 51 km south-west of Mokopane.

History
It was founded on the farm Vischgat in 1907 and administered by a health committee from 1919. The name Naboomspruit is Afrikaans but derived from Khoekhoen; ‘euphorbia tree stream’, after the Euphorbia ingens which grows there. The town was officially renamed Mookgophong on the 24 November 2006, by the South African government.

References

Populated places in the Modimolle–Mookgophong Local Municipality
Populated places established in 1907